Elachista acutella is a moth of the family Elachistidae. It is found in Russia (the Southern Ural Mountains).

The wingspan is 9.5–10.3 mm. The forewings are bluish white, with the basal 1/5 of the costa dark grey. There is a small brown spot in the middle of the wing at the fold and another similar spot at the distal 1/4 of the wing. The hindwings are bluish grey, with the fringe scales basally ochrous grey and distally bluish white.

References

acutella
Moths described in 2003
Endemic fauna of Russia
Moths of Europe
Taxa named by Lauri Kaila